Vukadinović is a Serbian surname, derived from the male given name Vukadin. Notable people with the surname include:

Dejan Vukadinović (born 1982), Montenegrin footballer
Đorđe Vukadinović (born 1962), Serbian philosopher, journalist and politician
Holly Valance (born Vukadinović, 1983), Australian actress, singer and model
Ivan Vukadinović (born 1984), Serbian footballer
Miljan Vukadinović (born 1992), Serbian footballer
Vlastimir Vukadinović (born 1982), Serbian basketball coach
Vukadin Vukadinović (born 1990), Serbian footballer
Vuko Vukadinović (1937–1993), Montenegrin politician

See also
Vujadinović

Serbian surnames
Patronymic surnames
Surnames from given names